Alexandre Nachi is a Canadian actor, born on August 16 1993 in Sainte-Julie, Quebec.  He is noted for his supporting role as Arturo in Ricardo Trogi's film 1991, for which he was a Prix Iris nominee for Best Supporting Actor at the 21st Quebec Cinema Awards in 2019.

Nachi began his career as a child actor, appearing in television series such as Sam Chicotte, Ramdam and Virginie. He has also appeared in films including Emotional Arithmetic, Stonewall, Allure, Fabulous (Fabuleuses), Death of a Ladies' Man and Arlette, and most recently in tv serie Les Mecs.

References

External links

21st-century Canadian male actors
Canadian male film actors
Canadian male television actors
Canadian male child actors
Male actors from Quebec
Living people
Year of birth missing (living people)